Ultimate Sacrifice may refer to:

 Ultimate Sacrifice, a 2017 album by Japanese power metal band Galneryus
 Ultimate Sacrifice: John and Robert Kennedy, the Plan for a Coup in Cuba, and the Murder of JFK, a 2005 book by Thom Hartmann